The first USS Turner (DD-259) was a  in commission in the United States Navy from 1919 to 1922. She served in a non-commissioned status as the water lighter YW-56 from 1936 to 1943, and was in commission as a miscellaneous auxiliary, the second USS Moosehead (IX-98), from 1943 to 1946.

As Turner

Named for Daniel Turner, the destroyer was laid down by Bethlehem Shipbuilding Corporation's Fore River Shipyard in Quincy, Massachusetts on 19 December 1918. Turner was launched on 17 May 1919, sponsored by Mrs. Leigh C. Palmer. The ship was commissioned at Boston on 24 September 1919.

After duty along the east and west coasts, Turner decommissioned at San Diego, California on 7 June 1922, and she was placed in reserve. Her name was struck from the Navy list on 5 August 1936.

Conversion to YW-56

On 28 September 1936 the four-stack destroyer was authorized for conversion to a self-propelled water barge. Converted at San Diego in October, she was re-classified to YW-56 and began operations in the San Diego area. The water lighter was assigned to the 11th Naval District 17 October 1940, and in May 1942 she was given additional duty as a ferry between San Diego and San Clemente Island.

As Moosehead

YW-56 was renamed Moosehead, the second U.S. Navy ship of that name, and reclassified IX-98 on 13 February 1943. Following installation of sonar and radar equipment, she commissioned at San Diego on 5 April 1943. She reported for duty with the Operational Training Command, Pacific Fleet, 11 April, and on 23 April she became the flagship of Rear Admiral Frank A. Braisted, COTCPac. During the remaining years of World War II Moosehead operated out of San Diego.

Between May 1943 and December 1944 Moosehead made an average of 11 round trips a month to San Clemente Island carrying passengers, mail, and cargo for the 11th Naval District. From August 1944 until early in 1945 she towed targets for battleships, cruisers, and destroyers and served as a torpedo target for destroyers and torpedo planes. In addition Moosehead screened battleships and cruisers during training exercises.

Moosehead carried out her most important service as an at-sea platform for training officers and men of Combat Information Center crews. She carried the latest radar and sonar equipment as well as a CIC classroom and berthing facilities. In July 1943 she began training CIC crews of escort carriers. Early in 1944 she broadened the scope of her training to include CIC teams from APAs, AKAs, DEs, ADs, and PCEs. In addition, she served as a test and evaluation ship for experimental rockets, radar equipment, and radio jamming devices.

Following the end of World War II, she continued training duty as flagship for commander, Training Command, West Coast. On 24 December 1945 she reported to the 11th Naval District for disposal.

She decommissioned at San Diego 19 March 1946, and her name was struck from the Navy list 17 April. She was released to the Maritime Commission 20 February 1947 and sold the same day to Hugo Neu for scrapping.

References

External links
 Navsource

 

Clemson-class destroyers
World War II auxiliary ships of the United States
Ships built in Quincy, Massachusetts
1919 ships